Clifford B. Latherow (December 4, 1915 – October 25, 1994) was an American farmer and politician.

Latherow was born on a farm near Fountain Green, Hancock County, Illinois. He graduated from La Harpe High School in La Harpe, Illinois and from Western Illinois University. Latherow served in the United States Navy during World War II and was commissioned a lieutenant. He taught in high schools. Latherow was a grain ad livestock farmer. He lived in Carthage, Illinois with his wife and family. Latherow served as a township supervisor and on the local board of education. He was a Republican. Latherow served in the Illinois Senate from 1965 to 1977. He died at Quincy Blessing Hospital in Quincy, Illinois.

Notes

1915 births
1994 deaths
People from Hancock County, Illinois
Military personnel from Illinois
Farmers from Illinois
Schoolteachers from Illinois
Western Illinois University alumni
Illinois city council members
School board members in Illinois
Republican Party Illinois state senators
20th-century American politicians
United States Navy personnel of World War II